Gun-Mouth 4 Hire: Horns and Halos 2 is the fifteenth album by Andre Nickatina, his third with Equipto and the second part in the Horns and Halos series. It was released on November 15, 2005 for Million Dollar Dream and was produced by Andre Nickatina, Nick Peace, Big D, Sync Knock, Danker-D, Freddy Machete and Laird.

Track listing
"U Got Talent"- 2:55  
"Da Spitz"- 3:25  
"Bonus"- 3:14  
"Caught in a Verse"- 2:38  
"A Pimp's Blood"- 3:08  Danker D
"God Gimme G's"- 3:33  
"Sip on Dat Note"- 2:44  
"All n da Game"- 4:03  
"Tell Dat ta Dummies"- 3:12  
"Knyte Rydah"- 2:54  
"Cotton Candy Land"- 3:12  
"4am-Bay Bridge Music"- 3:39  
"Box of Lucky Charms"- 3:34

References

2005 albums
Andre Nickatina albums